Shekofteh (Persian: شکفته), Shagufta or Shegufta  is a mostly feminine given name of Persian origin. It means Full-blown, Opened, or Cheerful. A related name is the Afghan Shegufa.  In Persian language, there is another similar name called Shokoufeh or Shekoufeh which means Blossom.



Notable persons

Given name 
 Shagufta Ali, Indian Bollywood film and television actress
 Shagufta Anwar, MPA of the Provincial Assembly of the Punjab in Pakistan
 Shegufta Bakht Chaudhuri, former governor of Bangladesh Bank
 Shagufta Ejaz (born 1960), Pakistani actress
 Shagufta Jumani, Pakistani politician and parliamentarian
 Shagufta Rafique, Indian filmscreenwriter
 Shagufta Yaqub, journalist and commentator

Surname 
 Sara Shagufta (1954–1984), Pakistani poet

References 

Pakistani feminine given names
Iranian given names
Afghan given names